Lamduan is a district (amphoe) in the central part of Surin province, northeastern Thailand.

History
The district dates back to the Mueang Suraphinthanikhom (สุรพินทนิคม), which was established in 1871. In 1896 it was converted into the district Lamduan, which was later dissolved.

On 3 January 1977 it was reestablished as a minor district (king amphoe) by splitting off the two tambons, Lamduan and Chok Nuea, from Sangkha district. It was upgraded to a full district on 19 July 1991.

Geography
Neighboring districts are (from the north clockwise): Sikhoraphum, Si Narong, Sangkha, Prasat and Mueang Surin.

Administration
The district is divided into five sub-districts (tambons), which are further subdivided into 51 villages (mubans). Lamduan Sunphin is a township (thesaban tambon) which covers parts of tambon Lamduan. There are a further five tambon administrative organizations (TAO).

References

External links
amphoe.com

Lamduan